Umnak is one of the Fox Islands of the Aleutian Islands. With  of land area, it is the third largest island in the Aleutian archipelago and the 19th largest island in the United States. The island is home to a large volcanic caldera on Mount Okmok and the only field of geysers in Alaska. It is separated from Unalaska Island by Umnak Pass. In 2000, Umnak was permanently inhabited by only 39 people and by 2010, around 18, placing the settlement of Nikolski in difficulty and its school was closed.

History
The earliest known settlement on Umnak Island is at Anangula and is 8,400 years old. Anangula was later abandoned and the Sandy Beach site became occupied, along with Idaliuk and Chaluka. Most of the early settlements on Umnak were located along the streams. A major geologic event was the cutting of strand flats during the Hypsithermal period, about 8250 to 3000 years ago, which led to a greater natural food supply on the island for the settlers.

Umnak Island was first reached by independent Russian fur traders in the 1750s. Abuses by the Russians led to an alliance among Aleuts in the Fox Islands. During the winter of 1761–1762, the crews of four Russian ships were massacred. This included one entire crew on Umnak which was completely wiped out. Russian traders responded with a scorched-earth campaign in 1764 that essentially ended the Aleuts' independence.

The modern history of Umnak Island is linked to the military bases established by the United States during World War II. The purpose of the forward air bases in the Aleutian Islands was not only to defend the Dutch Harbor, but also to launch attacks against the Japanese mainland.

The US Navy considered Umnak as exclusive and their own. They created a camouflage in the "Blair Fish Packing Co," to build airports and bases to be used by the US Army Air Force during World War II. After getting clearance from General DeWitt, General Buckner built airbases at Umnak (eventually known as Fort Glenn) and at Cold Bay. By the time the Japanese attacked in the summer of 1942, the US garrison at Umnak had a combined strength of 4000, including engineer companies complemented by infantry, as well as field and antiaircraft artillery units. The Japanese planned to attack and capture the island in June to maintain aerial patrols over North Pacific waters. Umnak was to be an outpost in a new area of dominance that would later include the Samoan and Fiji Islands and New Caledonia. The Japanese were unaware of the covert preparations being made by the United States as they believed that the island was only protected by a few ships operating in Aleutian waters.

Geography and climate

Umnak, the third largest of the Aleutian Islands after Unimak and Unalaska, lies in the Fox Islands of the Aleutian Islands of the Bering Sea, to the southwest of the larger island of Unalaska. The island is very mountainous with a low level of vegetation. The island does not have a harbor, although a sizeable bay is located in western part of the island and contains the Adugak Island. The southern point of the island is known as Cape Sagak.

The highest peak of the island, the Mount Vsevidof stratovolcano, is located in the southwestern part of the island. Its most recent eruption was caused by an earthquake on March 9, 1957. The mountain erupted on March 11, 1957, and the eruption ended the next day. The ancient settlement of Chaluka is located between this lake and Nikolski.

The north-northeastern part of the island contains tholeiitic basaltic rocks and is characterized by tension faulting, lava flows and fragmental deposits of igneous rocks. Following the formation of the caldera, numerous satellite cones and lava domes have formed on the flanks of the volcano. They include Mount Tulik on the caldera's southeastern slope, Mount Idak to the northeast, and Jag Peak. Small, shallow remnants of the lake remained north of Cone D at an altitude of about : a small shallow lake located between the caldera rim and Cone D; a smaller lake (named Cone B Lake) farther north near the caldera's gate. After the 2008 eruption, the hydrogeology of the caldera was greatly changed with five separate sizable lakes now emplaced. In addition to the caldera lakes, Cone A, Cone E, Cone G and the new 2008 vent on Cone D contain small crater lakes. The volcano is currently rated by the Alaska Volcano Observatory as Aviation Alert Level Green and Volcanic-alert Level Normal.

To the north from Mount Recheshnoi, in the valley of Geyser Creek are located geothermal fields with geysers. In 1988 here were active 5 geysers up to 2 m high and 9 natural fountains up to 0.7 m high.

Umnak has a subarctic climate (Köppen: Dfc), which borders on a subpolar oceanic climate (Köppen: Cfc) with short, mild to warm summers and long, cold, snowy winters.

Eruptions

Ash fell not only on the eastern part of the island but also on a fishing village   on the northeast. However, the Aleut village, Nikolski, on the opposite side of Umnak Island with a population of about 40 people to the west of Okmok Volcano escaped from the southeasterly path of the ash clouds. The ash plume also disrupted operation of flights to the Dutch Harbor airport as it spread across many miles of the North Pacific.

Okmok Caldera itself had been formed and reshaped in two major eruptions which occurred 12,000 and 2,000 years ago. Direct observations of later volcanic activity are known since 1805, with 16 eruptions recorded every 10 to 20 years. The 1817 eruption deposited several feet of ash and "scoria" rock debris on the northeastern caldera rim, with ash falling on Unalaska Island. Floods that occurred during this destroyed an Aleut village at Cape Tanak on the northeast Bering Sea Coast of the island.

Demographics

In 1941, when the island was being used as a military base by the United States, the population of the province consisted of only 50 Aleutians. , the island's population further declined to 39 persons. Its only remaining community, Nikolski, comprised the island's entire population. Fort Glenn, a former major military facility on the northeast shore of the island, played an instrumental role in the North Pacific Theater in World War II.

, there were 15 households and 12 families residing on the island. The racial makeup of was 30.77% White and 69.23% Native American.

There were 15 households, out of which 40.0% had children under the age of 18 living with them, 53.3% were married couples living together, 20.0% had a female householder with no husband present, and 20.0% were non-families. 20.0% of all households were made up of individuals, and none had someone living alone who was 65 years of age or older. The average household size was 2.60 and the average family size was 2.92.

In 2000, the median age was 40 years, with 35.9% under the age of 18, 30.8% from 25 to 44, 23.1% from 45 to 64, and 10.3% who were 65 years of age or older. For every 100 females there were 105.3 males. For every 100 females of age 18 and over, there were 92.3 males.

The median income for a household was $38,750, and the median income for a family was $40,250. Males had a median income of $26,250 versus $11,875 for females. The per capita income was $14,083. There were 23.5% of families and 20.7% of the population living below the poverty line, including 13.6% of under eighteens and 55.6% of those over 64.

Education
The only school on the island was in Nikolski, part of the Aleutian Region Schools. The Nikolski School served grades K-12. The school had one teacher who lived in a small home adjacent to the school building. The home is owned by the school district and was purpose-built for teachers and their families. The Nikolski School is in danger of extinction. Schools in rural Alaska must have at least 10 students to retain funding from the state. For the 2009–2010 school year, the Nikolski School had only nine students including a Samoan family who subsequently relocated, and was closed in 2010

Transport

Umnak does not have a harbor. It does, however, have an airstrip, Nikolski Airport. Building an airport runway in the hilly terrain was a unique engineering achievement of the Army Engineers, commanded by Colonel Benjamin B. Talley. The construction work of the runway was proposed at Otter Point on the northeastern end of Umnak. Construction was started in the middle of January 1942 and was commissioned by April of the same year, being given the name Fort Glenn.  of Marston Matting, a perforated-steel plating (PSP), was assembled along with other steel plates and created a flat surface for aircraft to take off and land. The runway was completed on March 31, 1942, by the 807th Unit of the Army Engineers.

The Naval Air Facility Otter Point was built next to Fort Glenn.

After the war ended, Fort Glenn remained open as a refueling stop for transient aircraft in the Aleutians along with Military Air Transport Service flights using the Great Circle Route from Japan to the United States.  The main runway was extended to 8,300 feet long to accommodate large, long range aircraft.  By 1946, the base maintained only a skeleton staff due to the rapid demobilization of the Army Air Forces. The last AAF personnel were withdrawn by 30 September 1947, and the base was put on inactive status and was effectively abandoned.  It was decommissioned in 1950 and the site was excessed between 1952–55 to the Bureau of Land Management. Many years later the airfield was added to the National Register of Historic Places as Cape Field at Fort Glenn. Some distance away, Nikolski is still served by a gravel airstrip.

See also
Mount Vsevidof, the highest point of Umnak
Umnak Airport

References

External links
Umnak homepage
 Late-Quaternary Geomorphic Processes: Effects on the Ancient Aleuts of Umnak Island in the Aleutians
 Remote Alaska Volcano Erupts, Spewing Rock and Ash

 
Fox Islands (Alaska)
Islands of Aleutians West Census Area, Alaska
Islands of Unorganized Borough, Alaska
Islands of Alaska
Closed installations of the United States Navy